Arnouville is a commune in the Val-d'Oise department in Île-de-France in northern France.

Previously known as Arnouville-lès-Gonesse, the name was officially renamed to Arnouville on 11 July 2010.

Population

Education
Public primary schools in the commune:
 Preschools (écoles maternelles): Victor Hugo, Anna Fabre, Charles Perrault, and Claude Demange
 Elementary schools: Victor Hugo, Danielle Casanova, Jean Jaurès, and Jean Monnet

The commune also has a junior high school, Collège Jean Moulin, and a vocational high school, Lycée d’Enseignement Professionnel Virginia Henderson. Lycée René Cassin, a general high school/sixth-form college, is in nearby Gonesse.

The private school network École Saint-Didier has its junior high division, Collège Saint Didier, in Arnouville, while the primary division is in Villiers-le-Bel.

Partnerships
The Commune has a Friendship Declaration with the village of Şəkər, Khojavend, of the de facto independent Nagorno-Karabakh Republic (which is de jure part of Azerbaijan). In June 2019, the French administrative court of Cergy-Pontoise declared that the signing breached French law by exceeding the authority of a municipal jurisdiction and by not respecting the international commitments of France (notably Nagorno-Karabakh's lack of recognition as a state), proclaiming the declaration null and void.

See also
Communes of the Val-d'Oise department

References

External links
Official website 

Association of Mayors of the Val d'Oise 

Communes of Val-d'Oise
Armenian diaspora communities